NHK News Ohayō Nippon （, ）is a Japanese morning television show on NHK General TV, anchored mainly by Masayuki Sanjo and Nachiko Shudo, from the NHK studios at NHK Broadcasting Center in Tokyo, Japan. It debuted in April 1993 replacing NHK Morning Wide. The weekend editions are anchored by Jiro Inoue and Erika Morishita.

This program airs weekdays from 4:30–8:00a.m.JST. The weekend editions air from 6:00–8:00a.m.JST (Saturdays), 7:00–7:45a.m.JST (Sundays), or 7:00–8:00a.m.JST (National Holidays). It is simulcast on NHK World Premium to countries other than Japan (except weekday edition, from 4:30–6:00a.m.JST).

Format

The weekday edition of the program is divided into two parts. The first part airs from 4:30–6:00a.m.JST only domestically on NHK General TV. It features live news, weather forecasts, special-interest stories and market information. The second part airs from 6:00–7:45a.m.JST both domestically and internationally, featuring news, sports, interviews, and segments such as "Koko ni Chumoku (Focus on This!)" (featuring in-depth political or economical topics by NHK's specialist on the field.), "Machikado Jōhōshitsu (Street Information Room)" (featuring inventions that help make people's daily life more convenient), "Sekai no Media Zapping" (featuring  selected viral video or television program clips from news bulletins all over the world), "Check! Entamé" (featuring pop culture and entertainment news, and viral videos), and "Ohayō Vitamin" (featuring a mix of entertainment, lifestyle and human-interest stories).

The Saturday edition begins at 6:00a.m.JST, featuring live news, sports, weather forecasts, market information, and some short stories until 8:00a.m.JST. The Sunday edition, airing from 7:00–8:00a.m.JST, features news, sports and weather forecasts.

Notable personalities

Main presenters 
 Masayuki Sanjo - weekdays (2017 – 2019, 2022 – present)
 Nachiko Shudo - weekdays (2006 – 2010, 2022 – present)
 Marie Morita - weekdays, biweekly (2022 – present)
 Ayumi Sato - weekdays, biweekly (2022 – present)
 Tomohiro Hatta - weekdays, triweekly (2022 – present)
 Shunkichi Sato - weekdays, triweekly (2021 – present)
 Jiro Inoue - weekend (2022 – present)
 Erika Morishita - weekend (2022 – present)

Sports 
 Nahoko Hori - weekdays, biweekly (2021 – present)
 Futoshi Nishisaka - weekend (2022 – present)

Weather information 
Yasuhiro Hiyama - weekdays (2018 – present)
Nao Kondo - weekdays (2021 – present)
Toshiyuki Minami - weekend (2007 – present)

Correspondents
Shinya Kuroda
Hiroki Yamada
Keiichi Tokunaga

Former personalities

Weekdays 

Isamu Akashi (1993 – 1994)
Yoshinari Imai (1993 – 1995)
Maoko Kotani (1993 – 1994)
Mitsuyo Kusano (1993 – 1994)
Nobuo Murakami (1994 – 1995)
Yumiko Udo (1994 – 1997, 2009 – 2010)
Hirohide Ito (1995 – 2000)
Norio Ishizawa (1995 – 1997)
Yukiko Ito (1996 – 1997)
Masaiku Nomura (1997 – 2000, 2004 – 2006)
Tamio Miyake (1997 – 2004)
Aiko Doden (1997 – 1999)
Toko Takeuchi (1997 – 2002)
Mariko Takai (1999 – 2001)
Koichi Sumida (2000 – 2003)
Seiko Nakajo (2001 – 2005)
Misuzu Takahashi (2002 – 2006)
Kaku Kakinuma (2003 – 2005)
Junichi Tosaka (2004 – 2005)
Yutaka Hoshino (2004 – 2005)
Takehiko Ito (2005 – 2006)
Toshiyuki Terazawa (2005 – 2006)
Tsuyoshi Matsuo (2005 – 2008)
Yuriko Shimazu (2005, 2008 – 2012)
Mihoko Kitago (2006)
Tadashi Goto (2006 – 2007)
Taisuke Yokoo (2006 – 2007)
Takashi Mashimo (2006 – 2007)
Tomoko Kogo (2006 – 2008, 2016 – 2019)
Tetsuya Kaneko (2007 – 2008)
Akira Kamioka (2007 – 2008)
Takeshige Morimoto (2007 – 2012)
Kozo Takase (2008 – 2010, 2017 – 2022)
Ryubun Sato (2008 – 2009)
Wataru Abe (2008 – 2017)
Yuko Isono (2008 – 2009)
Nami Morimoto (2009 – 2010)
Tomoki Muto (2010 – 2011)
Shie Ezaki (2010 – 2014)
Naoko Suzuki (2010 – 2015)
Takeshi Takigawa (2011 – 2014)
Kei Koyama (2011 – 2012, 2013 – 2016)
Tomohiko Katayama (2011 – 2012)
Yasuhiko Eto (2012 – 2013)
Yoji Itoi (2012 – 2015)
Noriko Kamijo (2012 – 2014)
Masaaki Arita (2013 – 2014)
Naoki Ninomiya (2014 – 2015)
Yosuke Nakayama (2014 – 2015)
Aiko Terakado (2014 – 2015)
Masanobu Horikoshi (2015 – 2016)
Ryuichi Yoshikawa (2015 – 2017)
Akiko Gobaru (2015 – 2016)
Mayuko Wakuda (2015 – 2020)
Takuya Tadokoro (2016 – 2018)
Keiko Nakamura (2016 – 2017)
Yurie Omi (2016 – 2018)
Nonoka Akaki (2017 – 2018)
Yohei Morita (2017 – 2018)
Seita Sato (2017 – 2019)
Mitsuki Uehara (2017 – 2018)
Katsuki Sato (2018 – 2021)
Yoshiki Iwano (2018 – 2019)
Risa Hayashida (2018 – 2020)
Sayuri Hori (2018 – 2020)
Shinji Shioda (2019 – 2022)
Shinya Tonegawa (2019 – 2022)
Kana Nakayama (2020 – 2021)
Erika Morishita  (2020 – 2022)
Maho Kuwako (2020 – 2022)
Takanobu Hayasaka (2020 – 2022)
Keiichiro Ebara (2021 – 2022)
Izumi Yamauchi (2021 – 2022)

Weekends 

Satoshi Hatakeyama (1993 – 1994)
Ayumi Kuroda (1993 – 1995)
Yutaka Hoshino (1994 – 1995)
Nobuo Murakami (1995 – 1997)
Keiko Hirano (1995 – 1997)
Hirohide Ito (1997 – 1999)
Kaoru Ishii (1997 – 1998)
Mariko Takai (1998 – 1999)
Atsuko Sueda (1999 – 2000)
Masaiku Nomura (1999 – 2000)
Masao Sueda (2000 – 2004)
Takako Zenba (2000 – 2004)
Tsuyoshi Matsuo (2004 – 2005)
Yuriko Shimazu (2004 – 2005)
Yutaka Hoshino (2005 – 2007)
Masako Takishima (2005 – 2007)
Takashi Mashimo (2007 – 2008)
Yuko Isono (2007 – 2008)
Takeshige Morimoto (2008 – 2012)
Nachiko Shudo (2008 – 2010)
Nami Morimoto (2010 – 2011)
Sawako Watanabe (2011 – 2012)
Shie Ezaki (2012 – 2014)
Kei Koyama (2012 – 2013)
Yuichi Chikada (2013 – 2017)
Mayuko Wakuda (2014 – 2015)
Noriko Kamijo (2015 – 2016)
Hidekazu Arai (2016 – 2022)
Tomoko Kogo (2016 – 2019)
Naoki Ninomiya (2017 – 2018)
Tomomi Hirose (2019 – 2022)
Asa Ishibashi (2019 – 2021)
Rika Kawasaki (2021 – 2022)
Minori Chiba (2017 – 2018)

References

External links
 Official Website (Japanese)

1993 Japanese television series debuts
1990s Japanese television series
2000s Japanese television series
2010s Japanese television series
NHK original programming
Japanese television news shows
Japanese-language television shows
Live television series
Breakfast television